Yip Hor Man (born 5 May 1970) is a Hong Kong backstroke and medley swimmer. He competed in three events at the 1988 Summer Olympics.

References

External links
 

1970 births
Living people
Hong Kong male backstroke swimmers
Hong Kong male medley swimmers
Olympic swimmers of Hong Kong
Swimmers at the 1988 Summer Olympics
Place of birth missing (living people)
Swimmers at the 1986 Asian Games
Asian Games competitors for Hong Kong